Little Women is an 1868–69 novel by Louisa May Alcott.

Little Women may also refer to:

Film
 Little Women (1917 film), a 1917 British silent film directed by Alexander Butler
 Little Women (1918 film), a 1918 American silent film directed by Harley Knoles
 Little Women (1933 film), starring Katharine Hepburn and Joan Bennett
 Little Women (1949 film), starring Elizabeth Taylor and June Allyson
 Little Women (1994 film), starring Winona Ryder, Susan Sarandon, Kirsten Dunst, and Christian Bale
 Little Women (2018 film), starring Sarah Davenport and Lucas Grabeel
 Little Women (2019 film), starring Saoirse Ronan, Emma Watson, Timothée Chalamet, and Meryl Streep

Television

Based on the novel 
Little Women (1950 TV series), produced by Pamela Brown for the BBC
 Little Women (1958 TV series), produced by Joy Harington for the BBC
 Little Women (1970 TV series), third adaptation produced for the BBC
Little Women (1978 miniseries) produced by Universal Television, starring Meredith Baxter and Susan Dey
 Little Women (1981 TV series), produced by Toei Animation
 Tales of Little Women, produced by Nippon Animation
 Little Women (2017 TV series), adapted by Heidi Thomas for the BBC
 Little Women (2022 TV series), a South Korean television series

Dwarfism 
 Little Women: LA, an American reality television series (2014-) based in Los Angeles, California
 Little Women: NY, an American reality television series (2015-) based in New York City
Little Women: Terra's Little Family,  an American reality television series (2015-)
 Little Women: Atlanta, an American reality television series (2016-)
 Little Women: Dallas, an American reality television series (2016-)

Stage
 Little Women (musical)
 Little Women (opera)

Music 
 Little Women, band formed in 1982 by Jerry Joseph and others

See also 

 Dwarfism
 Girl
 "Little Woman", a 1969 song by Bobby Sherman
 "Little Woman Love", a 1971 song by Wings
 "A Little Woman", a 1923 short story
 The Little Woman, a 1962 film